Unión Cantinil is a municipality in the Guatemalan department of Huehuetenango.

Notes 

Municipalities of the Huehuetenango Department